Avsyuk Glacier is a glacier on Arrowsmith Peninsula, Graham Land, flowing northwest to Shumskiy Cove.

History
Avsyuk Glacier was named by the UK Antarctic Place-Names Committee in 1960 for Grigory A. Avsyuk, Russian glaciologist, a specialist on the glaciers of central Asia.

See also
 List of glaciers in the Antarctic
 Glaciology

References
 

Glaciers of Loubet Coast